Yngve Hågensen (born 13 July 1938, in Vardø) is a retired Norwegian labour union leader.

From an early age Hågensen has been active in Norwegian organization life and politics. He is most notable for his 12 years in office (1989–2001) as leader of the Norwegian Confederation of Trade Unions.

After his last term as trade union leader in 2001 he left the organization, but remains active in Norwegian politics as a political consultant. Hågensen is also part of the electoral campaign of the Norwegian Labour Party. He is also heavily involved in senior citizen related politics and adult education causes. Since 1972 he has been a strong supporter of the proposed Norwegian membership in the European Union.

He has written an autobiography titled "Gjør din plikt, krev din rett" (literally "Do your duty, claim your right").

External links
Information about his autobiography from Aschehoug publishing house (in Norwegian)
Interview with Yngve Hågensen at Norgesdokumentasjon (in Norwegian)

1938 births
Living people
Norwegian trade unionists
Norwegian political writers
Labour Party (Norway) politicians
People from Vardø